Norman Thomas Scott (6 June 1921 – 17 February 1957) was an Australian rules footballer who played with Geelong in the Victorian Football League (VFL). 

Prior to playing with Geelong, Scott served in the Australian Army during World War II.

Notes

External links 

		
1921 births		
1957 deaths		
Australian rules footballers from Victoria (Australia)		
Geelong Football Club players
East Geelong Football Club players